Khawaja Izharul Hassan (born 26 October 1971) is a Pakistani politician from the Muttahida Qaumi Movement Pakistan (MQM) and was the leader of the opposition in the 12th Sindh Assembly.
He is member of Provincial Assembly of Sindh since August 2018.

He is married and has three children. He won the PS-99 (Karachi-XI) seat in the 2008 and 2013 Pakistani general elections. Hassan served as the chairperson of the Standing Committee on Cooperatives in the 12th Sindh Assembly. He is also a member of the standing committees on Kachi Abadies; Information and Archives; and Planning, Development and Special Initiatives.

Assassination attempt
Early morning on 2 September 2017, he escaped unhurt in an assassination attempt following the Eid ul Adha prayer in Buffer Zone, Karachi by terrorist group Ansarul Sharia Pakistan. A police constable from Hassan's police guards and a 13-year-old boy were killed in the attack and at least four others were injured. One of the attackers was shot dead in retaliatory firing, while the second was injured but managed to flee. The police recovered as many as 27 bullet casings of 9mm pistol from the scene.

References

1971 births
Living people
Politicians from Karachi
Muttahida Qaumi Movement politicians
University of Karachi alumni
Sindh MPAs 2008–2013
Sindh MPAs 2013–2018
Leaders of the Opposition in the Provincial Assembly of Sindh